Ventricular inversion is a condition in which the anatomic right ventricle of the heart is on the left side of the interventricular septum and the anatomic left ventricle is on the right.

References

External links 

Congenital heart defects